Jacob Schwartz may refer to:

 Jacob T. Schwartz (1930–2009), American mathematician and computer scientist
 Jack Lawrence (songwriter) (Jacob Schwartz, 1912–2009), American musician
Jacob Schwartz (librarian) (1846-19?), American librarian